Hulda may refer to:

People 
 Hulda (given name)
 Hulda (poet), Icelandic poet
 Huldah, Biblical prophetess

Other uses 
 Hulda, a genus of moth
 Hulda (opera), by César Franck
 Hulda, Israel, a kibbutz in Israel
 Hulda-Hrokkinskinna, an Icelandic manuscript
 Mother Hulda, a German folk tale
 Holda, a character in Germanic folklore